BayFiles is a website and file hosting service created by two of the founders of The Pirate Bay.

BayFiles works by letting users upload files to its servers and share them online. Users are provided with a link to access their files, which can be shared with anyone on the internet so that they can download the files associated with the particular link. A unique aspect of this file hosting service is that it does not provide a search function for its users or any sort of file directory that could be used to navigate its online file base. BayFiles can be used and accessed by people without requiring them to sign up for it.

Legal issues 
One of the critical features of the BayFiles hosting service is that its founders have chosen to disallow the uploads of any content that violates third party copyright laws. This has come as a surprise to many people who are familiar with the founder's previous website The Pirate Bay, which was surrounded by legal controversy concerning copyright issues. In the website's terms of service, it asserts that it will disable the accounts of those users who frequently violate its copyright terms. BayFiles co-founder Fredrik Neij has even claimed to have hired DMCA agents who will help ensure that BayFiles is properly complying with current United States copyright law.

Despite BayFiles' goal of complying with U.S. digital copyright law, some have speculated that it will still potentially face major lawsuits because of the legal history its founders and their The Pirate Bay have had with record labels and movie studios in the past. But as long as BayFiles never explicitly promotes copyright infringement, it can maintain the legal status of its operation through relying on the precedent established in a 2010 court case won by RapidShare.

Bayfiles was shut down in November 2014. The reasons for the site's sudden disappearance are unknown, though some have indicated it was likely linked to the arrest of its sole registrant and former Pirate Bay operator Fredrik Neij.

Since July 2018 the website has been brought back to life, this time being run by a group of unknown operators.

References

External links

File hosting
The Pirate Bay
Internet properties established in 2011
One-click hosting